Son of Fred was the successor series to The Idiot Weekly, Price 2d and A Show Called Fred. It was made by Associated-Rediffusion and broadcast only in the London area, Midlands and Northern England.

It was the third and final in a series of sketch comedy shows attempting to translate the humour of The Goon Show to television. Spike Milligan concentrated on writing and only made small walk on appearances, leaving the lead acting to Peter Sellers. The series was produced and directed by Richard Lester.

Impact on comedy and culture
The minimalist format, with little or no scenery and few props, sketches without any real purpose or punch line, and mixing live action and short animations directly influenced the format of Monty Python's Flying Circus. The unconventional format was revived in Spike Milligan's Q series more than a decade later.

A half hour special Best of Fred was broadcast on 18 September 1963 combining surviving sketches from A Show Called Fred and Son of Fred.

The 1997 convention of the Goon Show Preservation Society was billed as Son of a Weekend Called Fred.

Archive status
The show is believed lost, with the exception of the first episode, which is available to stream on BFI Player.

Footnotes

1956 British television series debuts
1956 British television series endings
1950s British television sketch shows
British surreal comedy television series
ITV sketch shows
Lost television shows